The Rebecca and John Moores Cancer Center is the region's only NCI-designated Cancer Center in La Jolla, California, part of UC San Diego Health and affiliated with the University of California San Diego. It is supported, in part, by the National Cancer Institute.

History 
The center was established in 1978 and received its NCI designation the same year. It earned comprehensive status in 2001. There are approximately 360 faculty members affiliated with the center.

A five-story building, home to the center, was opened in La Jolla in 2005.

The Moores Cancer Center provides outpatient treatment on site. Inpatient hospital treatment is provided at the adjacent Jacobs Medical Center in the Pauline and Stanley Foster Pavilion for Cancer Care, which opened in 2016 and has three floors dedicated to oncology, and at UC San Diego Medical Center in Hillcrest, which has recently expanded its cancer services.

Scott Lippman has been the director since 2012. He previously worked at MD Anderson Cancer Center.

The six major research programs at Moores Cancer Center comprise the following: Cancer Biology; Cancer Genes and Genome; Cancer Prevention and Control; Hematologic Malignancies; Reducing Cancer Disparities; and Tumor Growth, Invasion, and Metastasis.

Notable faculty 
 Roger Tsien
 Thomas Kipps, discoverer of ROR1, and contributed to the development of cirmtuzumab
 Ezra Cohen
 Don W. Cleveland
 Marilyn Farquhar
 Napoleone Ferrara
 Quyen T. Nguyen

References 

UC San Diego Health
Teaching hospitals in California
Hospitals established in 1978